Joe Zimmerman is an American stand-up comedian, currently residing in New York City.  He has appeared on several television shows including Conan on TBS, The Late Late Show with Craig Ferguson, The Tonight Show, and Last Comic Standing Season 8.  He has also made appearances on Nickelodeon, Comedy Central, and Sirius XM.

He is originally from Morgantown, WV.  He started doing comedy in North Carolina in 2006 and continued performing in neighboring areas until he moved to New York City in 2012.  During his career as a stand up comedian, he has performed at many colleges and corporate events. He is currently touring across multiple venues in the United States.  His tour dates can be found on his website, ZimmermanComedy.com.

References

Year of birth missing (living people)
Living people
21st-century American comedians
People from Morgantown, West Virginia